Jean-Cédric Maspimby (born 3 October 1977 in Angouleme, France) is a French footballer who played on the professional level for French Ligue 2 clubs Gueugnon, Brest, Reims and Boulogne during the 2002–2008 seasons.

External links

References

French footballers
1977 births
Living people
Association football midfielders
Martinique international footballers
Martiniquais footballers
Angoulême Charente FC players
FC Gueugnon players
Stade Brestois 29 players
Stade de Reims players
US Boulogne players